Entimus splendidus is a species of broad-nosed weevils belonging to the family true weevil and the Entiminae subfamily.

Description
The basic colour is black. Elytra are strongly convex and laterally compressed, punctured with longitudinal rows of brilliant golden-green dots.

Distribution
This rare species can be found in Brazil.

References 

 Biolib
 Universal biological Indexer
 Global species
 Juan J Morrone    The Neotropical Weevil Genus Entimus (Coleoptera: Curculionidae: Entiminae ): Cladistics, Biogeography, and Modes of Speciation Society (2002) - Volume: 56, Issue: 4, Publisher: BioOne, Pages: 501-513
 Juan J Morrone  The species of Entiminae ranged in America South of United States

External links
 Virtual Beetles
 Worldfieldguide

splendidus
Entiminae
Beetles described in 1792